Kamienica Królewska is a non-operational PKP railway station in Kamienica Królewska (Pomeranian Voivodeship), Poland.

Lines crossing the station

References 
Kamienica Królewska article at Polish stations database, URL accessed at 18 March 2006

Railway stations in Pomeranian Voivodeship
Disused railway stations in Pomeranian Voivodeship
Kartuzy County